The Lovers is a public art work by artist Mark di Suvero located at the Lynden Sculpture Garden near Milwaukee, Wisconsin. The sculpture is an abstract form; it is installed on the lawn.

Description 
The sculpture is composed of industrial steel I-beams. The I-beams, a recurring element of di Suvero's work, are cut and welded into a series of crossed bars arranged diagonally and painted red.

References 

Outdoor sculptures in Milwaukee
1971 sculptures
Steel sculptures in Wisconsin
Abstract sculptures in Wisconsin
1971 establishments in Wisconsin
Works by Mark di Suvero